The striped ponyfish (Aurigequula fasciata) is a species of marine ray-finned fish, a ponyfish from the family Leiognathidae. It is native to the Indian Ocean and the western Pacific Ocean, from the Red Sea and the eastern coast of Africa to Fiji and Samoa, where it occurs in coastal marine and brackish waters. It is a predator upon smaller fishes, small crustaceans and polychaete worms. This species grows to a length of  TL though most do not exceed  TL. It is of minor importance to local commercial fisheries. This species is the only known member of its genus.

References

Leiognathidae
Monotypic fish genera
Bioluminescent fish